Gregory Lawrence Bishop (born May 2, 1971) is a former American college and professional player who was an offensive tackle in the National Football League (NFL). He was drafted in the 4th round (93rd pick overall) of the 1993 NFL Draft by the New York Giants. He played for the Giants and the Atlanta Falcons.

Biography
Bishop was born in Stockton, California and graduated from Lodi High School. He played college football at the University of the Pacific, where he played defensive lineman and left tackle.
 
Bishop played six seasons for the New York Giants, and one season for the Atlanta Falcons before retiring in 1999.
In 2004, Bishop was inducted into the University of the Pacific Hall of Fame.

He and his wife Julie live in Lodi, California and he is an assistant coach on the Lodi High School football team.

References

External links 
 Pacific Tigers: Pacific Athletics Hall of Fame: The 2004-05 Inductees of the Pacific Athletics Hall of Fame
 Lodi News Sentinel

1971 births
Living people
American football offensive linemen
Atlanta Falcons players
New York Giants players
Pacific Tigers football players
People from Lodi, California
Players of American football from California
Lodi High School (California) alumni